Fortanerius Vassalli (died October 1361) was an Italian Franciscan who became Minister General of the Order of Friars Minor, and a cardinal a few weeks before he died on the way to Avignon.

He held a wide variety of ecclesiastical posts. He was Patriarch of Grado. He attacked the Manfredi of Faenza. He was Archbishop of Ravenna (1348 in one source, stepping down as minister general, but in other sources 1342–7) and Patriarch of Venice. He was also appointed Archdeacon of London late in 1361, and Prebendary of St. Paul's.

Notes

1361 deaths
Archbishops of Ravenna
Italian Friars Minor
14th-century Italian cardinals
Year of birth unknown
Franciscan cardinals
Ministers General of the Order of Friars Minor
14th-century Italian Roman Catholic bishops